The visual art of Singapore, or Singaporean art, refers to all forms of visual art in or associated with Singapore throughout its history and towards the present. The history of Singaporean art includes the indigenous artistic traditions of the Malay Archipelago and the diverse visual practices of itinerant artists and migrants from China, the Indian subcontinent, and Europe. 

Singaporean art includes the sculptural, textile, and decorative art traditions of the Malay world; portraiture, landscapes, sculpture, printmaking, and natural history drawings from the country's British colonial period; along with Chinese-influenced Nanyang style paintings, social realist art, abstract art, and photography practices emerging in the post-war period. Today, it includes the contemporary art practices of post-independence Singapore, such as performance art, conceptual art, installation art, video art, sound art, and new media art. The emergence of modern Singaporean art, or more specifically, "the emergence of self-aware artistic expression" is often tied to the rise of art associations, art schools, and exhibitions in the 20th century, though this has since been expanded to include earlier forms of visual representation, such as from Singapore's historical periods. 

Presently, the contemporary art of Singapore also circulates internationally through art biennales and other major international exhibitions. Contemporary art in Singapore tends to examine themes of "hyper-modernity and the built environment; alienation and changing social mores; post-colonial identities and multiculturalism." Across these tendencies, "the exploration of performance and the performative body" is a common running thread. Singapore carries a notable history of performance art, with the government historically having enacted a no-funding rule for that specific art form from 1994 to 2003, following a controversial performance artwork at the 5th Passage art space.

Ancient Singapore

Artefacts and artistic traditions of the Malay world 
Situated in the Malay Archipelago, Singapore is connected to the broader sculptural, textile, and decorative art traditions of the Malay world.

A 14th-century golden armlet bearing a repoussé plaque of the Javanese Kala was excavated from Bukit Larangan (Fort Canning Hill) in 1926, demonstrating a link between Singapore and classical Malay sultanates. The kala motif draws from Hindu mythology, and traditionally adorns the top of main entrances of temples and is found in many parts of Indonesia. Demonstrating the use of metalworking techniques, the armlet dates back to the 14th century, around the time a possible Kingdom of Singapura would have been thriving on the island, complementing indigenous Malay writings about the presence of a state in Singapore headed by a Malay elite. The armlet also demonstrates the influence of the Hindu cosmology for Malays in their pre-Islamic past.

Another significant artefact is the Singapore Stone, a surviving fragment of a large sandstone slab inscribed with Indic script that stood at the mouth of the Singapore River, measuring 3 metres in height and width. Believed to date back to at least the 13th century and possibly as early as the 10th or 11th century, the inscription remains undeciphered. More recent theories suggest that the inscription is either in Old Javanese or in Sanskrit, which suggests the possibility that the island was an extension of the Majapahit civilisation in the past. About January 1843, the slab was blown to pieces to widen the passageway at the mouth of the Singapore River to make space for Fort Fullerton and for the quarters of its commander, leaving only fragments of the slab.

Early cartographic references 

The earliest visual references to ancient Singapore exist predominantly in artifactual and cartographical forms rather than explicitly in visual art forms. These representations and artefacts help demonstrate a progression towards the specific formulation of visual art practice in Singapore as self-aware artistic expression later in the 19th and 20th centuries. The earliest possible cartographic depiction may be the 2nd century CE Geographia by Greco-Roman astronomer Ptolemy, with a place called Sabana or Sabara marked on the 11th Map of Asia at the southern tip of the Golden Khersonese (meaning the Malay Peninsula) where Singapore may lie. A 1573 map by Ignazio Danti further depicts Cingatola as an island located on the tip of Regio di Malaca.

Early Singapore came to be known as "Temasek", a name possibly deriving from "tasik" (Malay for lake or sea) and taken to mean Sea-town in Malay. The landmass of Temasek (淡馬錫) is visually depicted in the Mao Kun map published in 1628, a set of navigation charts published in the Ming dynasty military treatise Wubei Zhi. Long Ya Men (龍牙門, Dragon's Teeth Gate) is also depicted within the map, believed to be the entrance to Keppel Harbour. The map is often regarded as a surviving document from the 15th century expeditions of Zheng He, in addition to accounts written by Zheng's officers.

Sometime in its history, Temasek came to be known as Singapura. The Sejarah Melayu (Malay Annals) contains a tale of a prince of Srivijaya, Sri Tri Buana (also known as Sang Nila Utama), who landed on Temasek after surviving a storm in the 13th century. According to the tale, the prince saw a strange creature, which he was told was a lion; believing this to be an auspicious sign, he decided to found a settlement called Singapura, which means "Lion City" in Sanskrit. It is unlikely there ever were lions in Singapore, though tigers continued to roam the island until the early 20th century. Such narratives of origin have continued to serve as the basis for artistic works and projects by modern and contemporary artists.

Colonial Singapore (1819–1942) 
From the 16th to 19th centuries, starting with the arrival of the Portuguese at Malacca in 1509, the Malay Archipelago was gradually taken over by European colonial powers. During the 17th century, the early dominance of the Portuguese was challenged by the Dutch, who came to control most of the ports in the region, while colonial powers such as the British had a relatively minor presence. Sir Stamford Raffles, appointed as the Lieutenant Governor of the British colony at Bencoolen in 1818, arrived in Singapore on 28 January 1819 and soon recognised the island as a choice for a new port. Raffles sought to challenge the Dutch by establishing a new port along the Straits of Malacca, which served as the main ship passageway for India-China trade. A formal treaty was signed on 6 February 1819, ushering in Singapore's colonial period. The British concentrated on building infrastructure such as housing, roads, and hospitals in order to maintain a thriving economy, and did not set up an art academy. While Raffles did intend for the teaching of art, the first British art teacher, Richard Walker, would only arrive almost a hundred years after Raffles' death in 1923.

The visual art of this period was diverse, with travellers, itinerant artists, and migrants from places around Asia such as China, the Indian subcontinent, as well as the territorial West arriving in Singapore, all bringing different pictorial traditions and methods of image-making methods. From the 19th century, European perspectives of Singapore could be observed through the visuals created of people and landscapes, which often depicted "tropical" motifs such as palm trees, kampungs, and studies of local inhabitants. Such subject matter would later recur in the works of Singapore artists from the 1930s onwards.

Early visual records as a British settlement (19th century) 

Some of the earliest visual records of Singapore as a British settlement exist as part of marine coastal surveying processes in the 19th century, which were employed by ships for navigational purposes. One of the earliest surviving depictions is Singapore from the Rocky Point, 1819, a wash drawing by John Michael Houghton, a midshipman who served on board the HMS Discovery as part of the naval escort accompanying Raffles on his journey to Singapore in 1819. Painted during the time Raffles first set foot on the island, it is one of 41 drawings belonging to the Houghton Album, which contains a compilation of views drawn by Houghton. Other early works include hydrographic sketches made by an unknown draughtsman on board one of the two marine ships accompanying Raffles in his survey of Karimun Islands, Sketch of the Land round Singapore Harbour, dated February 1819, alongside another work, Sketch of the Settlement of Singapore at anchor in 4 fathoms, dated April 1819, and Philip Jackson's A View of Singapore from the Sea dated 1823.In this context, the 19th-century European artist was seen as an individual who possessed the technical skills to accurately depict what was seen, with draughtsmanship allowing one to record information about coastlines and harbours prior to the advent of photography. Such visual recordings, though meant as technical drawings, share formal similarities with later landscape works that were instead created purely for artistic expression. For example, Robert Wilson Wiber's watercolour painting, Panoramic View of Singapore from the Harbour (1849) depicts the island from a similar perspective, gazing upon it from the sea. Popular representations of Singapore in the 19th century often included harbour and port scenes, as Singapore was largely known as a British port. Singapore was often represented as a port-of-call in prints and illustrated expedition narratives produced in Europe, which focused on its commercial significance, also depicting scenes of the Singapore River, a continued motif as one of the impressions of Singapore in the 19th century. British officers who worked as surveyors, architects, and engineers in colonial Singapore were some of the early artists to create images of Singapore, such as Charles Andrew Dyce and John Turnbull Thomson who both painted views of Singapore.

In 1865, the German popular spreadsheet Die Gartenlaube published the article "Die Tigernoth in Singapore," which begins with an account of an escaped jaguar from a local zoo and continues with George Drumgoole Coleman's encounter with a tiger during a surveying trip near a jungle in Singapore in 1835. Accompanying the article was a lithographic print by Heinrich Leutemann, Unterbrochene Straßenmessung auf Singapore (Road Surveying Interrupted in Singapore) (c. 1865–1885), which depicts the dramatic moment when the tiger leaps out from the dense jungle and knocks over Coleman's theodolite. The work has been of significant interest to recent scholarship, which focuses on the historical and metaphorical significance of the tiger. It has further been suggested such an incident was exaggerated or did not truly occur, emphasising the imaginary surrounding the supposed dangers of the Southeast Asian jungle.

Natural history drawings 

Scientific explorations in the 19th century led to artistic engagements with nature, the colonial drive to gather knowledge manifesting through categorisation of the flora and fauna of the Malay Archipelago. Natural history drawings commissioned by William Farquhar during his time as Resident of Malacca from 1803 to 1818 were some of the earliest visual practices of the region. The drawings served as an important aid for scientific study at the time, supporting the practice of preserving natural history specimens. While the artists who created these works are largely unknown, it has been observed that motifs such as rocks and trees in the landscapes of these drawings bear similarities to Chinese ink tradition, revealing traces of the unknown artist(s). Chinese artists have been present in Malaya from as early as the mid-19th century, mainly as commercial artists who remain largely unknown in the history of art, though their activities may be observed through the production of such natural history drawings and ancestral portraits of the period.

Early photography 
The earliest surviving photographic views of Singapore as a British settlement are Jules Itier's 1844 daguerreotype of Boat Quay and Singapore River from Government Hill. By the 19th century, prominent studios were established by arrivals from abroad such as August Sachtler, G.R. Lambert, and John Thomson, alongside Japanese and Chinese photography studios. The presence of photography studios further shaped image-making processes and how Singapore was represented. A. Sachtler & Co.'s views of Singapore were taken 20 years after Itier's daguerrotype, illustrating the large advances in photography. 

In the late 19th century and early 20th century, commercial photography studios would produce photographs of locals to represent different ethnicities, establishing visual tropes associated with these identities. Also popular were photographs depicting different professions such as hawkers or barbers. While some photos were commissioned, some were also mass produced according to market demands.

Portraiture in British and Straits Chinese practices 
While portraiture was employed to capture the power and social status of British authorities, it was similarly used in an ethnographic manner to record the appearance of local inhabitants and encounters with them. These Eurocentric perspectives of representing self and other observably manifest in natural history drawings and early photography. 

The Straits Chinese communities had an established tradition of producing ancestral portraits. Ancestral portraits by Straits Chinese, also seen in Malacca and Java, were created for facilitating customary rituals for honouring ancestors. In the 20th century, prominent Straits Chinese personalities were early adopters of the medium of oil to represent themselves, such as in Portrait of Tan Kim Seng by Qu Chiqing (c. Mid 19th century). These practices of self-representation among the Straits Chinese communities extend across Malacca, Penang, and Singapore, suggesting a common engagement with portraiture. 

A portrait of renowned poet Khoo Seok Wan from the album Fengyue qinzun tu (Painting of Zither Romance) (1898) by Yu-Tao demonstrates another form of portraiture, this time in the Chinese literati tradition of ink painting.

Malay printed material 
Singapore holds examples of the Malay Archipelago's traditions of illuminated manuscripts and early Malay illustrated newspapers. Such print media demonstrates a well-established visual modernity in the region during the 19th century.

Scribes adorned books with illustrated motifs and decorations, as seen in the decorated frontispiece for the lithographic edition of Hikayat Abdullah (The Tale of Abdullah) by Abdullah Abdul Kadir, better known as Munshi Abdullah. This autobiography of Munshi Abdullah was lithographed at the Mission Press in Singapore in 1849. It is one of the first Malay language books published in print and written by someone who identified as Malay. Abdullah was born in Melaka in 1796, though his work eventually brought him to Singapore where he served as secretary and personal Malay tutor to Raffles.

In the earlier version of the manuscript for Hikayat Abdullah, the frontispiece was decorated with figurative sketches of simple red and green floral motifs, denoting flowers and leaves, and surrounded by a simple frame. The relatively simple decorative approach was likely due to how ornate decorations would not have been rendered well with lithography. However, these decorations reflect the illustrator's efforts in experimenting with different types of more complex and realistic depictions of subject matter like flora, through the manipulation of depth and space. Three-dimensional properties of the motifs are seen in how the scripts were darkened to suggest forms and shadows, providing an embossed effect or the illusion of depth to the illustrations and decorative foliate patterns.

An early example of a Malay newspaper was the Jawi Peranakan, beginning circulation in 1876 to meet the increasing need for reading materials by locals in Malaya. It was published in Jawi script and produced in Singapore due to the port city being one of the main trading hubs in the region. The newspaper remained in circulation for nearly 20 years until 1895. Jawi Peranakan had a large masthead with an illustrated logo depicting a pohon beringin (banyan tree) frame which contained elaborate mirrored Jawi typography, encapsulated by a garland.

Later, the 1920s saw the growth of Malay publishing houses throughout the Straits Settlements. While the history of Malay printing within the Straits Settlements and the Malay peninsula is closely tied to the production of religious texts, the 20th century also saw publishing play a greater role in politics, commerce, and entertainment. Malay identity was no longer seen as strictly Islamic, with arguments for Malay identity to be seen from more local or ‘peninsular’ perspectives. Discussions of Malay identity went beyond text, taking visual form in satirical editorial cartoons in the 1930s, as well as advertisements aiming to influence lifestyles of local communities through the introduction of new or foreign products.

Chinese ink art 

By 1840, Singapore had a huge influx of Chinese migrants, partly due to the Opium Wars in the 1840s and growing Southeast Asian markets which increased the demand for labour. Within Southeast Asian Chinese immigrant society, there was an absence of the gentry class who usually bore the traditional aesthetic values and practices from which artists would come. By the late 19th century, only a small group of people, many of whom were cultural elites from the scholar-gentry class from China's traditional imperial system, had the privilege to partake in and promote art activities in Singapore. One example is poet Khoo Seok Wan, a prominent figure in local Chinese literary circles, and the only person to have passed the Qing court imperial examinations among Chinese immigrants in Singapore. The album Fengyue qinzun tu (Painting of Zither Romance) (1898), which contains ink painting, calligraphy, and seal carving with literature, provides key examples of traditional literati art which these cultural elites circulated and promoted to the local community. Literati art was thus regarded as being distinct from works made by artisans or court painters.

Chinese calligraphy, considered a highly sophisticated art form, was commonly practiced in Singapore's context among the Chinese intelligentsia as a form of daily self-cultivation. Celebrated poet and scholar Pan Shou was very influential of the early generation of Singaporean and Malayan calligraphers. The early generation taught the second generation of calligraphers, which includes figures such as Tan Siah Kwee, Lim Tze Peng, and Koh Mun Hung, whose practices are said to have matured post-World War II. Ink paintings by Nanyang artists Chen Wen Hsi, Chen Chong Swee, and Cheong Soo Pieng from the 1950s onwards also revealed modern variations in uses of Chinese ink, such as in Chen Wen Hsi's Playful Gibbons (c. 1980s).

Sculpture in colonial Singapore 

The earliest instances of public sculpture in Singapore include commemorative monuments of colonial elites, along with architectural reliefs that visually embellished the more functional components of a building. A well-known instance of public sculpture in Singapore during the colonial period is the bronze statue of Stamford Raffles, depicting Raffles standing with arms folded. Sculpted by English sculptor and poet Thomas Woolner, it was installed in conjunction with the Golden Jubilee of Queen Victoria on 27 June 1887 at the Padang, and is presently located at the Victoria Theatre and Concert Hall.

From the 1930s, European artists such as Dora Gordine, Karl Duldig, Rudolfo Nolli, Tina Haim-Wentscher, and Julius Wentscher arrived in Singapore, staying for a short period of time. These artists held exhibitions in Singapore, some receiving commissions for various public works such as sculptures. For example, Gordine was commissioned to create a series of bronze head sculptures that depicted various ethnicities for Singapore's Municipal Building in the 1930s. Meanwhile, Nolli designed the marble decorations of the College of Medicine Building, Singapore, completing it in 1926, and of the Old Supreme Court Building, completing it in 1939. During the 1938 Glasgow Empire Exhibition, sculptor Tina Haim-Wentscher and painter Julius Wentscher participated in representing Malaya, with the former creating sculptures for the exhibition, and the latter designing a Malayan pineapple display.

Another practice of sculpting from this period include the stone sculptures accompanying graves found at the Bukit Brown Municipal Cemetery, which opened in 1922 and closed in 1973. Detailed stone statues depicting Sikh guards, the Jade Maiden, and guardian lions accompany graves from the early 20th century. While not conventionally included in the history of sculpture in Singapore, sculptures from Bukit Brown Cemetery are now being examined as an example of art.

Hindu temple sculpture and murals 

The tower-gateways or gopuram of Hindu temples in Singapore are often filled with sculptures made by unnamed South Indian artisans known as sthapathiyaars. These sculptures are of great significance in the South Indian style of temple architecture, working in tandem to emphasise Hindu cosmology and mythology, enhancing the spirituality of the temple they adorn. While religious art has a complicated relationship to art history, with temple sculptures not conventionally included in Singapore's art history, such works are now being more recently studied as art in Singapore.

Examples of Hindu temple sculpture may be seen at the Sri Mariamman Temple. Closely intertwined with the arrival of the first Indians in Singapore, the Sri Mariamman Temple was built in 1827 as the oldest Hindu temple in Singapore. Sculptures and ornamentations added during a major reconstruction from 1862 to 1863 were created by skilled craftsmen from the Nagapattinam and Cuddalore districts of Tamil Nadu in South India. While the original gopuram of the temple was initially more sparsely decorated, during another restoration of the temple in the 1960s, elaborate sculptures and carvings were added. The inner walls are further embellished with murals that depict scenes from Hindu mythology. Until today, artisans and sculptors from South India are engaged to restore these sculptures each time the temple is renovated and re-consecrated.

Another instance may be seen from the Sri Sivan Temple, with Hindu temple sculptures approximately dating from the 1960s to the 1980s now in the collection of the National Heritage Board. Originally located on Orchard Road, the land on which the temple stood was acquired by the Singapore Government in 1983 to build the Dhoby Ghaut MRT station. The Sri Sivan Temple was relocated, donating some of its sculptures to the National Heritage Board, including sculptures of Lord Shiva, Lord Vishnu, and Lord Brahma, or of Lord Shiva and Goddess Parvati on their vahana or vehicle, flanked by nandis or sacred bulls, and a sculpture of Lord Ganesha and secondary deities sitting on his vehicle, Moonchooru.

Art associations, schools, and exhibitions (20th century) 

The early 20th century saw the rise of art associations, art schools, and exhibitions before World War II. With the arrival of Europeans in Singapore and the region, new modes of perception and representation informed local artistic production. Now emerging were individualistic artistic impulses and ideas of art as self-expression, with art practices engaging with and contesting the European gaze from visual art produced in the 19th century.

In 1909, the Amateur Drawing Association was founded, led by its first president Tan Kok Tiong. It had a club house in Amoy Street and a membership of about 50 in its first year, its activities including "drawing, literary pursuits and physical culture," though there were few "drawing members" in spite of an exhibition of members' drawings held in February 1913. The Amateur Drawing Association suggests a social network of art enthusiasts who were associated with the Straits Chinese and British elite. The association fostered local art practices of figures such as brothers Low Kway Soo and Low Kway Song, the latter being one of the earliest professional artists to practise within the region and make a living through his photography studio and commissions. Low Kway Song's Lynx (1921) and Thai Temple (1923) are art historically notable as some of the few oil paintings from Singapore that can be traced to this moment of artistic production in the early 20th century. Meanwhile, the Kuala Lumpur-based United Artists Malaysia (Nanyang shuhua she) was founded in 1929, promoting ink painting and calligraphy as an embodiment of Chinese culture to a migrant society that was thought to be lacking in cultural enrichment. 

By the 1930s, European artists from abroad would arrive in Singapore, staying for a short period of time, inspired by the sights and locals they encountered. One such artist who stayed on and left significant lasting impact was Richard Walker, a British artist who was the art superintendent for the Department of Education in Singapore from 1923 to 1951. Responsible for the teaching of art in local British schools, Walker was expected merely to fulfil the colonial school system requirements by teaching watercolour in art classes, a matter which frustrated him greatly and denied the art scene further development. Walker later became a founding member of the Singapore Art Society in 1949, and further contributed to the development of watercolour in Singapore. Lim Cheng Hoe, one of Singapore's most prolific and renowned watercolourists, was a student of Walker's.

The visual art scene in 1930s Singapore could also be defined by its cosmopolitanism, with many artists who were trained overseas arriving during this period, particularly those who would become prominent in the history of Singapore's art such as Liu Kang, Chen Chong Swee, and Lim Hak Tai. Taught Indian technique and western style of painting in college, Annaratnam Gunaratnam came to Singapore by boat in 1939 from Madras with paintings and sculptures for an art exhibition in Kuala Lumpur, staying in Kuala Pilah through World War II and later migrating to Singapore in 1946. Gunaratnam was head of the art department at the Raffles Girls' Secondary School from 1948 to 1968 in Singapore. Her practice was in the genre of portrait sculpture, as seen in the sculpture Mavis (1953), which depicts a woman with dignity, capturing the folds in a woman's clothing and details in her facial expression. Sustaining her practice through commissions, Gunaratnam produced portrait sculptures of significant dignitaries like Mahatma Gandhi and Swami Vivekananda.Artists such as Xu Beihong, and later on in the 1950s, Georgette Chen, would have held exhibitions abroad and gained international recognition before arriving in Singapore. They brought with them the visual practices of the School of Paris, which further shaped local painting styles. Xu Beihong visited Singapore seven times from 1919 and 1942, a prominent artist who participated in broader efforts to modernise art in China, and was admired by Singapore artists such as Chen Chong Swee. Xu painted Put Down Your Whip (1939) in Singapore, inspired by his encounter with a theatrical performance that dramatised the plight of refugees who had fled the war in China. Put Down Your Whip further expresses the political involvement of Chinese artists at the time, who, like Xu, were committed to fundraising efforts for refugees during the Second Sino-Japanese War.

Lim Hak Tai, arriving in Singapore between 1936 and 1937, founded and became principal of the Nanyang Academy of Fine Arts in 1938, now the oldest formal tertiary art institution in Singapore. Possibly one of the earliest still life studies in oil at present is Lim Hak Tai's Still Life – Flowers (1938). Lim Hak Tai was active in the Society of Chinese Artists alongside Tchang Ju Chi, another artist trained overseas. The Society of Chinese Artists was founded in 1935, consisting mostly of alumni from Shanghainese art academies. Tchang Ju Chi's Still Life (c. 1930s) features a composition of tropical fruit such as mangoes, rambutans, and mangosteens, arranged before a piece of batik fabric, demonstrating an emerging interest in local motifs at this period in the 1930s. Works from this period show the early attempts of artists to capture local life and aesthetics in the region, incorporating tropical light and its motifs. During this time, Chinese-speaking writers and artists began using the term "Nanyang" to refer to the region of Southeast Asia where they had settled in, encouraging each other to explore localised forms of expression in literary and artistic practices.

Japanese Occupation (1942–1945) 

In 1942, the arrival of World War II in Singapore led to a slowing down of the artistic activities that emerged in the 1930s. Art from this period reflected artists' experiences of the war, as seen in Richard Walker's Epiphany (1942). Epiphany, or the thirteenth day of Christmas, celebrates the revelation of Christ to the Magi. Painted in an allegorical style, the work portrays the Virgin Mary as an Asian woman to symbolise the universal truth of Christianity. Likely used as an improvised altarpiece in Changi Prison, the work reflects his internment during the war.  

Tchang Ju Chi's Untitled, Unfinished (c. 1942) also alludes to Tchang's untimely death in 1942 during the Japanese Occupation in Singapore. The small collection of works left behind by Tchang demonstrate his early engagement with tropical motifs, positioning him as one of the likely major proponents of the Nanyang style of painting had he survived the war. In 1946, just after the war had ended, Liu Kang published Chop Suey, a multi-volume series of sketches that depicted Japanese brutality during wartime Malaya.

Post-war period (1945–1955) 
The Japanese surrender to the Allies took place on 15 August 1945. Much of Singapore's infrastructure had been destroyed during the war, including electricity and water supply systems, telephone services, as well as the harbour facilities at the Port of Singapore, leaving the populace with food shortages and high unemployment, the economy only beginning to pick up in 1947. The failure of Britain to defend Singapore had destroyed its credibility as a ruler in the eyes of Singaporeans, marking a political awakening with the rise of anti-colonial and nationalist sentiments, epitomised by the slogan Merdeka, or "independence" in the Malay language. The British were prepared to gradually increase self-governance for Singapore and Malaya in the following years, with the first local elections on a limited scale for several positions in the government of Singapore starting in 1948 after an amendment to the Constitution of Singapore. The search for national identity as Singapore and Malaya moved towards independence, with hopes of forming a unified Malayan identity that superseded distinct ethnic cultures embody the key artistic concerns of the period leading up to the merger. These ideas for creating a multicultural Malaya out of a largely immigrant society would thus fundamentally shape arts discourse for Singapore. 

New artists and art associations arose as Singapore recovered from World War II. In 1949, Malaysian artist Latiff Mohidin arrived in Singapore, enrolling in Kota Raja Malay School where his artistic talent was discovered by his art teacher and headmaster. By 1951, a 10-year old Latiff held his first exhibition at the school, and he was based between Singapore and Malaya until receiving the DAAD Scholarship in 1960, when he relocated to Europe to further his art education. Figures such as Abdul Ghani Hamid, Lim Cheng Hoe, and Singapore-based Nas Achnas, an artist, illustrator, and film director, were all active at this point in time, also meeting and influencing Latiff's early art activities. Artists such as the Indonesian-born Aman bin Ahmad (Pak Man), also a famous backdrop painter at Shaw Brothers Malay Film Productions, and M. Sawoot A. Rahman (Pak Sawoot) were also active artists in Singapore during this period.

Society of Malay Artists Malaya (Late 1940s–50s) 

On 1 May 1949 at the Kota Raja Club in Singapore's Kampung Glam, artists Mahat bin Chadang (C. Mahat) and Mohammed Salehuddin founded the Persatuan Pelukis Melayu Malaya (PPMM, Society of Malay Artists Malaya). The founding of the society has been considered an early instance of collective artistic organisation for Malay artists in Singapore. 

The same year in October 1949, the Singapore Art Society (SAS) was established by Liu Kang, Richard Walker, and Suri Mohyani to promote art in Singapore and the exchange between different ethnic groups. Suri Mohyani later also became a mentor to Latiff Mohidin.

The artists of PPMM attempted to create a space for discourse on Malay artistic modernism, particularly by publishing art writings in Mastika, a Malay language print periodical, through the 1950s. Even though Singapore had been made a Crown Colony in 1946 and separated from the Straits Settlements, the anti-colonial and independence movement rising in Singapore during this moment was operating with the eventual merger with the Malaya mainland in mind. PPMM's membership thus reflected this sense of political and cultural inseparability between Singapore and Peninsular Malaya, with its members including Malay artists from Peninsular Malaya such as Nik Zainal Abidin, AB Ibrahim, Saidin Yahya, Idris Salam. PPMM artists did not subscribe to a specific school of painting, an example of their experimentation being Mohd Salehuddin's 1951 watercolour painting Bahana Asmara (Echo of Love), which featured a distorted and seemingly nude female figure in the style of Cubism, reminiscent of Fernand Léger. Displaying an eclectic approach, Mohd Salehuddin's later work, Malay House, Malacca (c. 1960), would by comparison be a figurative oil painting featuring a Malaccan-style longhouse with an attap roof, raised floor, and open verandah, accompanied by accurate details such as tiles with floral motifs on the steps to the house.

In February 1951, the PPMM held its first show at the British Council Hall, showcasing a total of 197 artworks. The exhibition included works depicting Malayan scenery, occupations, and events. In particular, an article from The Straits Times titled "Paintings of Nadra on Show", highlighted two oil paintings that depicted Maria Hertogh, the Dutch teenager whose custody battle sparked a series of racial riots the previous year in December 1950, Nadra being the name Hertogh was given after her conversion to Islam.

The PPMM's activities began to decline in the 1950s, and the Angkatan Pelukis Muda (Young Artists' Movement) was founded as an alternative in 1956. Headed by Abdul Ghani Hamid, the Angkatan Pelukis Muda was quickly dissolved from a lack of support garnered.

Nanyang Style (Late 1940s–60s) 

Amidst sociopolitical upheavals in China, significant figures such as Chen Wen Hsi, Cheong Soo Pieng, and Fan Chang Tien arrived in Singapore from the 1930s onwards, setting the foundations for the emergence of a distinct, localised artistic identity for Singapore art by the second half of the 20th century. Some of the most well-known visual practices from the history of Singapore art lies with the migrant Chinese artists painting in the Nanyang style from the late 1940s to 1960s, depicting local subject matter while drawing upon Western watercolor and oil painting, as well as Chinese ink traditions. The most famous are figures such as Chen Chong Swee, Chen Wen Hsi, Cheong Soo Pieng, Georgette Chen, and Liu Kang. As immigrant artists captivated by the novelty of tropical landscapes, the Nanyang artists characteristically depicted Southeast Asian landscapes and material culture such as tropical fruit, kampung scenes, and batik fabric while synthesising Western and Chinese painting techniques. The name of the movement draws from "Nanyang", a sinocentric Chinese term used to refer to Southeast Asia from the geographical perspective of China. Nanyang art holds great significance as a critical period in Singapore's art history, as it demonstrates some of the earliest conscious attempts by artists in Singapore to generate a local art discourse. Singapore's foremost art historian T.K. Sabapathy, alongside Malaysian art historian Redza Piyadasa are the first scholars who attempted to classify the artistic approaches of the Nanyang artists within an art historical framework, doing so in 1979 when they organised a survey exhibition of Nanyang art at the Muzium Seni Negara Malaysia.

The Nanyang artists are particularly known for embarking on a 1952 painting trip to Bali, with the resulting 1953 exhibition Pictures from Bali presenting paintings of Balinese and Southeast Asian material culture. The excursion to Bali introduced new sights to the Nanyang artists, and subject matter of these works included the women of Bali and imaginings of rural Balinese life. An example is Liu Kang's Artist and Model (1954), which depicts fellow artist Chen Wen Hsi sketching a Balinese woman. Painted in 1954, it is theorised that the work is based on a sketch made during their field trip to Bali two years earlier. Within the painting, the outlines are rendered white instead of Liu Kang's usual black outlines—a visual style that has been said to be inspired by batik painting.
Georgette Chen arrived in Singapore in 1953, having previously been based in locations such as Paris, New York, Hong Kong, Shanghai, and Penang. Her paintings, which often depicted subject matter from the world around her, reflected the changes in her environment, with paintings in Singapore and Malaya capturing the effects of tropical light. The 1965 painting Sweet Rambutans, for instance, is representative of Chen's interest in capturing a local subject matter such as rambutan fruit with her technique of oil painting drawing from the School of Paris.

While Nanyang art gained maturity in the 1950s and 1960s, its position declined when challenged by the emergence of other artistic influences gaining currency amongst younger artists, such as Social Realism. While tropical landscapes attracted the early immigrant artists with their exotic novelty, the younger generation of Singapore-born artists who lived through complex periods of decolonisation and independence sought to be more reflexive regarding local social issues. Abstraction also offered another visual form of expression for artists who came into contact with international art scene through overseas studies and travels during the 1960s, a method that some Nanyang artists had begun experimenting with in the early 1960s.

Pictorialism and salon photography (1950s–60s) 
In Singapore, the photographic movement of pictorialism marked the beginnings of the modern practice of photography as a fully self-conscious art form. While the earlier pictorial photographers in Europe and North America were driven by the desire for photography to be recognised as art, Singaporean photographers did not face the same pressure to legitimise photography as art. It was the Singapore Art Society that held the first photographic salon in 1950, which meant photographs were already being considered within the context of “art”. The Art Society also had a “Photographic Group” presenting exhibitions and submitting prints to various salons. In Singapore, photography was being regularly exhibited alongside paintings in shows as early as 1951.

This lack of tension between painting and photography meant that Singaporean pictorial photographers were much more open towards different photographic styles. Pictorialism in Singapore is thus seen as "an assertion of individual expression that manifested as a distinct pluralism of styles and subject matter", with an emphasis on "expression and beauty".

The Singapore Camera Club was formed in 1950, initiating the Pan-Malayan Photographic Exhibition in 1953. The club was later renamed as the Photographic Society of Singapore (PSS), and took over organising the Open Photographic Exhibition, renaming it the Singapore International Salon in 1957 and growing its size and reputation.

Some pictorial photography practices at the time range from the manipulated photo montages by Lee Lim (who owned a photography studio in Tiong Bahru) and Tang Yao Xun; to the “straight” photographs by Wu Peng Seng and Yip Cheong Fun. Photographers such as Lee Sow Lim, Lim Kwong Ling, and Chua Tiag Ming were also active at this period of time. 

Pictorial photography in Singapore often overlapped with studio and commercial photography, with practitioners such as well-known pictorialist photographer Chua Soo Bin shooting for advertising campaigns, and Tan Siong Teng working as a photographer for the Chinese newspaper, Nanyang Siang Pau. Other examples include pictorial photographer Tan Lip Seng, who was a medical photographer at the National University of Singapore Hospital, and Foo Tee Jun, who photographed singers at Life Records and later became photographer for the Ministry of Environment.

Self-government (1955–1963) 
David Marshall, leader of the Labour Front, became the first Chief Minister of Singapore. He presided over a shaky government, receiving little cooperation from both the colonial government and the other local parties. The 1950s were particularly turbulent years for Singapore, with social unrest on the rise. Demonstrations were held by Chinese students against the National Service Ordinance in 1954, followed by the Hock Lee bus riots in 1955, leading to injuries and death. In 1956, the Chinese middle schools riots broke out among students in The Chinese High School and other schools, further increasing the tension between the local government and the Chinese students and unionists who were regarded as having communist sympathies. Coming during the tumult of the Malayan Emergency, communists were seen as having instigated such movements, with fears continually stoked of a communist threat that threatened national stability. This culminated in Operation Coldstore on 2 February 1963, where 113 people were arrested as part of a security operation that "aimed at crippling the Communist open front organisation", many of whom were from leftist groups that posed a challenge to the Lee Kuan Yew-led People's Action Party.

The competing ideologies of the time were a product of the Cold War, which further manifested in the realm of cultural production as contesting visual vocabularies for expression, such as the opposition between realism and abstraction that was expressed by proponents of each style. Amidst these events, art societies continued to be established. The Angkatan Pelukis Aneka Daya (APAD, Association of Artists of Various Resources) was established in July 1962 with Abdul Ghani Hamid as its president.

On 27 May 1961, Malaya's Prime Minister, Tunku Abdul Rahman, proposed the idea of a Federation of Malaysia, comprising the existing Federation of Malaya, Singapore, Brunei and the British Borneo territories of North Borneo and Sarawak. The proposal was an unexpected shift, as Singapore leaders had proposed for merger as early as 1955. The Tunku was initially resistant to the idea of co-opting Singapore into Malaysia, though the British persuaded the Tunku to consider merger with Singapore by making it a condition for the decolonisation of Malaya.

Social Realism and the Equator Art Society (mid-1950s–70s) 

After World War II, artists were led by the burgeoning sense of nationalism and anti-colonialism to reflect the ongoing social and political conditions of Singapore and Malaya. The movement of Social Realism gained currency in Singapore from the mid-1950s onwards, with artists intent on reflecting lived experience in Singapore through the use of realist-style painting and a socially-engaged practice that directly involved their subjects to create works that commented on social issues. In 1956, the Chinese Middle Schools' Graduates of 1953 Arts Association (SCMSGAA), composed of students from local Chinese middle schools, organised a fundraising exhibition at the Chinese Chamber of Commerce. Championing Social Realism as a means of representing the realities of the working class and propelling social change, the exhibition catalogue stated their belief that "Art belongs to the people—it is the public, and should serve the public," further proclaiming that they were "prepared to commit all our efforts to help Malaya gain her independence and her process of nation-building." The SCMSGAA ceased activities after the exhibition, likely due to its perceived left-leaning politics and its strong criticism of colonial administration. On 22 June 1956, a new art society called the Equator Art Society (EAS), comprising many members previously from SCMSGAA, was registered.

In 1958, the EAS organised its inaugural exhibition, which featured over 400 works such as sculptures and paintings in oils, watercolours, and pastels. One of the most well-known social realist paintings from the EAS is Chua Mia Tee's National Language Class (1959), a work that has been interpreted a reflection of emerging nationalist identity, with Malay language uniting the various ethnic communities. The painting depicts Singaporeans of different ethnicities attempting to free themselves from English, the language of their colonial masters, by learning Malay, the national language of Singapore, Malaya, and the Malay World. Then, left-wing Chinese school students demanded that the study of Malay replace English in their Chinese medium schools in preparation for merger with Malaya.

Apart from portraiture painting, the emergence of the woodcut movement in the 1950s marked a significant decade in the history of Social Realism. The use of woodcut could be traced back to ideas from the woodcut movement from China, as propagated by Lu Xun. Woodcut prints, as accessible expressions of everyday life, could be disseminated through print media such as magazines and newspapers, allowing an alternative mode of exhibiting beyond the walls of an art gallery and raise awareness of sociopolitical issues. Lim Yew Kuan's After the Fire (Bukit Ho Swee) (1966) depicts the aftermath of a landscape ravaged by fire, a common occurrence in Singapore estates such as Tiong Bahru and Havelock Road, with one of the most serious being the Bukit Ho Swee Fire of 1961.

Internationalism and abstract art 

Often seen in contrast to realist approaches to painting of this period were the pictorial schemas of abstraction, which were in dialogue with art movements such as Cubism, American Abstract Expressionism, Minimalism, and Surrealist practices in 1960s Taiwan such as the Fifth Moon Group. Some artists who practiced abstraction are described as having engaged in Internationalism, that is, the international proliferation of art movements and styles to develop a universal visual language and aesthetic that could ideologically function across global cultures. Artists such as Anthony Poon, Thomas Yeo, Goh Beng Kwan, and Kim Lim were influenced by their time overseas, with their work reminiscent of the visual language of Abstract Expressionism, Op Art, and Minimalism. For example, Singaporean-British artist Kim Lim's stainless steel sculpture, Column (1971–72), has been seen as an instance of Minimalist art in Britain.

Artists such as Jaafar Latiff, Sarkasi Said, and Abdul Ghani Hamid from the Angkatan Pelukis Aneka Daya (APAD, Association of Artists of Various Resources), newly-founded in 1962, explored abstract compositions in batik and oil painting. Abdul Ghani's The Face in Meditation (1975), for instance, depicts a face that appears to be masked, with contorted limbs stretching across the canvas, visually reminiscent of batik with its strong outlines and bold colours. Early experimentations in abstraction could be observed in the work of the Nanyang artists, such as Cheong Soo Pieng and Ho Ho Ying. 

While Singapore artists who practiced realism believed that realist art was socially engaged, communicative, and humanist as it evoked empathy in its viewers, abstraction was criticised by detractors as anti-humanist, false, and violent, being a superficial, decadent, and decorative visual form that kept artists in the confines of an ivory tower. These competing visual vocabularies and ideologies would play out across art manifestos published in Singapore in the 1950s. For example, Lee Tian Meng's "Three Reasons against the Ideas of Pablo Picasso", published in a 1956 exhibition catalogue under the name of the SCMSGAA, decried Cubism as a visual language which "denies the heritage of tradition, discards humanity and truth in art, and emphasises hypocrisy and anti-realism". Artist Ho Ho Ying, who later founded the Modern Art Society in 1963, defended abstraction in 1958 in a debate with artist Chen Fan, who came from a social realist tradition. Ho argued for abstraction as a modern visual language that was universal, an idea that would form the basis of the Modern Art Society's founding later in 1963.

Association of Artists of Various Resources (APAD) 
In April 1961, the art section of Lembaga Tetap Kongres Bahasa dan Kebudayaan Melayu (LTK, Permanent Board of Congress of Malay Language and Culture) staged a major exhibition at the Victoria Memorial Hall. The exhibition featured the works of 34 Malay artists, both established and emerging. The exhibition publication documented works in the show from established artists such as C. Mahat, Sulaiman Haji Suhaimi, M. Salehuddin, M. Sawoot, Aman Ahmad, and younger artists like Abdul Ghani Hamid, S. Mohdir, S. Mahdar and Rohani Ismail. Calls for an art society for Malay artists led to the formation of the Angkatan Pelukis Aneka Daya (APAD, Association of Artists of Various Resources) in July 1962. APAD was led by Abdul Ghani Hamid, Muhammad Ali Sabran, S. Mohdir, Ahmin Haji Noh, Hamidah M. F. Suhaimi and Mustafa Yassin. Other members that came to contribute to APAD include Rohani Ismail, Maisara (Sara) Dariat, Rosma Mahyuddin Guha, and Hamidah Jalil.

The association continues to organise solo and group exhibitions, also collaborating with other cultural groups, art societies, and institutions, locally and regionally.

Singapore in Malaysia (1963–1965) 
On 16 September 1963, the merger between Malaya, Singapore, North Borneo (renamed Sabah), and Sarawak took place, marking the official formation of Malaysia.

The Modern Art exhibition (1963) and the Modern Art Society 
In 1963, the Modern Art Society (MAS) was launched with Ho Ho Ying as president. The group first organised the Modern Art exhibition, held at the National Library from 12 October to 27 October 1963. The exhibition featured 70 paintings by 7 artists: Johnda Goh, Tan Yee Hong, Ng Yan Chuan, Ho Ho Ying, Tay Chee Toh, Wee Beng Chong, and Tong Siang Eng. The success of the Modern Art exhibition led these artists to formally register the MAS with the Registrar of Societies on 4 June 1964.

It must be noted that the emergence of modern Singaporean art, or more specifically "the emergence of self-aware artistic expression", has been situated in earlier forms of visual representation, such as from Singapore's colonial period, far earlier than the 1963 establishment of the Modern Art Society. However, the founding of the MAS helped to further establish abstract painting instead of social realist painting as a modern visual language in the context of 1960s Singapore, with MAS proposing the idea that form was a universal language. In the preface to the 1963 art catalogue, the MAS included its modern art manifesto, declaring that: "Strictly speaking, Realism has passed its golden age; Impressionism has done its duty; Fauvism and Cubism are declining. Something new must turn up to succeed the unfinished task left by our predecessors... We do not mean to belittle the achievements of traditional art, but we certainly do not agree with those who stick to the old course".

MAS president Ho had previously defended abstraction in a 1958 debate with Chen Fan, a social realist artist. MAS now posited that elements of colour, shape, and line did not need to carry culturally specific meaning, with abstract painting thus "effective and essential in promoting better understanding amongst the various countries of the world." The foreword of the Modern Art exhibition catalogue describes the aims of the society as including "the promotion of modern art in Malaysia, to better the standard of art composition, and to establish closer relation with artists and others interested in modern painting." Here, the use of the term "Malaysia" rather than "Malaya" or "Singapore" is significant in marking this specific time period where Singapore was part of Malaysia. The MAS had desired for the Modern Art exhibition to travel to other parts of Malaysia, including Kuala Lumpur.

Extensive local media coverage was given to the Modern Art exhibition, particularly through sources like Chinese newspapers and the English-language The Straits Times. Attention was generated by prominent figures such as writer and physician Han Suyin as the exhibition's guest of honour, and Frank Sullivan, who was the first administrator of the National Art Gallery in Kuala Lumpur. Just a week into the Modern Art exhibition, one of the paintings was reported in newspapers as being intentionally damaged by a visitor. Specifically, Tay Chee Toh's painting was slashed by another artist whose practice the MAS had rejected as outmoded, demonstrating the tensions and contestations surrounding abstract painting and its role in society.

By 1964, the MAS annual exhibition expanded to include 5 new artists: Sim Pang Liang, Loo Pook Chiang, Tan Ping Chiang, Han Kuan Cheng, and Swee Khim Ann.

Republic of Singapore (1965–present) 
Singapore's short-lived union with Malaysia was strained with racial tensions and economic disagreements, and Malaysian Prime Minister Tunku Abdul Rahman decided to expel Singapore from the federation. On 9 August 1965, the Parliament of Malaysia voted in favour of a constitutional amendment expelling Singapore from the federation, leaving Singapore abruptly as an independent, sovereign nation. With the Konfrontasi ongoing and the conservative UMNO faction opposing the separation, Singapore was left in danger and vulnerable of attack and an invasion, particularly by the Indonesian military and also risked forcible re-integration into the Malaysian federation on unfavourable terms. At the time, much of international media was skeptical of prospects for Singapore's survival, with the country facing severe issues of unemployment, housing, education, and the lack of natural resources and land.

Speaking in 1968 in response to an audience question after a speech at the University of Singapore, the then Prime Minister Lee Kuan Yew famously stated that "Poetry is a luxury we cannot afford", instead citing technical education as being more important. Literature and more generally the arts were seen as needing to be deferred in the face of more urgently needed processes of industrialisation and nation-building after the fact of Singapore's abrupt independence. This stance only shifted in the 1990s, when cultural development was viewed as a necessity for the country to gain its status as a developed nation.

Contemporary art practices 

By the 1970s, Singapore artists had begun to turn away from modernist ideas of painting and sculpture, exploring forms associated with contemporary art such as performance, installation, and video. Conceptualism could be seen in the work of artists such as Cheo Chai-Hiang and Tang Da Wu, both of whom were members of the Modern Art Society. Widely considered the earliest example of conceptual art in Singapore is Cheo's 5’ x 5’ (Singapore River), which he submitted in 1972 for the Modern Art Society's annual exhibition. Based in London for studies at the time, Cheo mailed to Singapore a set of instructions to create a square measuring 5 feet by 5 feet at the exhibition space, though the work was eventually not selected to shown for the exhibition. 

The same year, the society accepted Tang Da Wu's Space Experimentation, one of the earliest examples of installation art shown in Singapore. In 1979, Tang produced Gully Curtains, the first land art work in Singapore, shown at the exhibition Earth Work. Also in 1979, Tan Teng Kee organised The Picnic, an outdoor exhibition which featured a "fire sculpture" work that burnt as the night arrived, functioning both as critique of the notion of the art object as well as a performance. Artist-organised festivals and projects took place beyond the museum, demonstrating the shift towards independent networks that were unlike the formal organisation of societies such as the Modern Art Society and the Equator Art Society. Artists now came together and apart in loose formations, valuing experimentation and dialogue. Artists utilised diverse artistic languages spanning printmaking, textile, abstract painting, new media art, found objects, and batik, as seen in the practices of Chng Seok Tin, Eng Tow, Goh Beng Kwan, Lin Hsin Hsin, Mohammad Din Mohammad, and Jaafar Latiff, all of whom remained active during the period of the 1970s to 1990s. 

In 1984, the LASALLE College of the Arts (then named the St Patrick's Arts Centre) was founded by Brother Joseph McNally. McNally had arrived in Singapore in 1946, spending almost 40 years teaching in the various affiliated schools of the De La Salle Order, such as St. Joseph's Institution and St. Patrick's Secondary School. The institution was funded largely through McNally's personal finances, with the low priority the state placed on the arts at that time.

While the National Museum Art Gallery was inaugurated in 1976 with the pioneering curatorial work of Constance Sheares and Choy Weng Yang, it was the 1989 Report of the Advisory Council on Culture and the Arts (ACCA) that would form the basis for cultural policy in the 1990s. The report eventually spurred the formation of the National Arts Council and the National Heritage Board in 1991 and 1993 respectively, as well as the founding of the first dedicated art museum in Singapore, the Singapore Art Museum, in 1996, altering Singapore's organisational and institutional landscape for visual art. Happening just before or while these institutional shifts played out, alternative art practices flourished from the late 1980s: Gatherings that led to Tang Da Wu's co-founding of The Artists Village began in 1988; the same year the joint exhibition Trimurti was held by S. Chandrasekaran, Goh Ee Choo, and Salleh Japar; theatre doyen Kuo Pao Kun founded The Substation in 1990; and the 5th Passage art space was launched by Suzann Victor and Susie Lingham in 1991.

The Artists Village 

Singapore art in the 1980s and 1990s may be characterised by flares of activity around particular spaces, exhibitions, and people, with The Artists Village (TAV), co-founded by Tang Da Wu, being one such instance. Returning in 1988 to Singapore from his studies in London, Tang started inviting artists to his home, a farm in Sembawang, to make and discuss art. Tang's ideas influenced many young artists, and the gatherings developed into an artist community that staged its first exhibition in January 1989 titled Open Studio Show, where the name "The Artists Village" was first used. Ten artists were involved in the first show, including Tang himself, Hazel McIntosh, Tang Dahon, Amanda Heng, Lim Poh Teck, Baet Yeok Kuan, Tang Mun Kit, Soh Siew Kiat, Vincent Leow, and Wong Shih Yaw. The activities of TAV and the number of artists involved would expand quickly, becoming a significant part of the local arts landscape by the end of that same year. Other figures from TAV included Lee Wen, Koh Nguang How, Ahmad Mashadi, Ho Soon Yeen, and Juliana Yasin. TAV fostered a shift towards performance and installation, also returning to experimenting with figuration in painting and drawing instead of the abstraction of high modernism witnessed in the practices of earlier Singaporean abstract painters of the 1960s and 1970s. 

Several significant works were created from TAV's activities, such as during A Sculpture Seminar in 1991, organised by Tang with many members of TAV participating. A two-week seminar on ideas about sculpture at the National Museum Art Gallery in the lead-up to the National Sculpture Exhibition, one of the most well-known works to emerge from the event was Study of Three Thermos Flasks (1991) by M. Faizal Fadil, then a young member of TAV. Faizal had bought the flasks from the Sungei Road flea market and stated that they were sculpture. While making a direct allusion to Dada artist Marcel Duchamp's earlier famous readymade, Fountain (1917), the work was significant for provoking significant public debate in Singapore, with writers in The Straits Times publishing opposing views about the work's artistic merit. 

Beyond activity at the Sembawang farm, which was lost in 1990 to redevelopment, TAV staged their projects elsewhere. One of the most significant was a 1992 event, The Space, held at Hong Bee warehouse in Robertson Quay, which featured forty local and twenty international artists. Another was the Artists Investigating Monuments (AIM) series which were held at various monuments and historical sites.

Trimurti 

In 1988, three recent graduates from the Nanyang Academy of Fine Arts (NAFA), S. Chandrasekaran, Goh Ee Choo, and Salleh Japar, refused to take part in their own graduation show. Instead, they staged the seminal exhibition, Trimurti, at the Goethe Institute in Singapore. The title of the exhibition takes from the Hindu concept of trimurti, the trinity of Hindu deities manifested as forces of creation, preservation, and destruction. Presenting paintings, installations and performances, the trio treated the gallery as a collaborative space rather than a curated selection of individual works, creating an exhibition that could be viewed as a single large installation. The trio sought to develop an artistic language inspired by Indian-Hindu, Chinese-Buddhist, and Malay-Muslim vernacular traditions and cultural values for Chandrasekaran, Goh, and Salleh respectively. For instance, the mixed media work Visvayoni (1988) by Chandrasekaran draws reference from the Hindu concept of creation and preservation through deity Shiva and his consort Sakti, together manifesting Visvayoni, the womb of the universe. 

Trimurti has been critiqued for drawing upon essentialist affiliations between race and religion, of Indians with Hinduism, Chinese with Buddhism, and Malays with Islam. Whether ironically or not, the artists of Trimurti emphasised their differences in identity by relying on these essentialist affiliations, aligning with then-Prime Minister Lee Kuan Yew's emphasis on preserving distinct racial identities within the country, in his specific envisioning of "racial harmony" and "multiculturalism" . 

In the context of NAFA, however, with Fine Art teachers frequently conducting their classes in the Chinese language, it was significant that the name chosen for the exhibition was Hindu, particularly with Indians as a racial minority in Singapore. Trimurti thus called out the cultural bias present in NAFA, particularly for the two non-Chinese artists of the show, asserting that they may not be ethnically Chinese, but were equally Singaporean nonetheless. Chandrasekaran would further position Trimurti as being rooted in elements from this region, in contrast to the "Western-oriented body language" The Artists Village were seen as having inhabited.

5th Passage and performance art ban 

The 5th Passage Artists Limited, an artist-run initiative and contemporary art space, opened in 1991 at Parkway Parade, a shopping centre in the east of the city. 5th Passage was co-founded in 1991 by Suzann Victor, Susie Lingham, and Han Ling, later joined by Daniel Wong, Henry Tang and Iris Tan. The initiative's programming emphasised an interdisciplinary approach, exhibiting performance art, installation, music, photography, and design, also organising public readings and forums.

From 26 December 1993 to 1 January 1994, the Artists' General Assembly (AGA) was held at the 5th Passage art space, an arts festival that the initiative co-organised with The Artists Village. During the 12-hour AGA New Year's Eve show from 31 December 1993 to 1 January 1994, Josef Ng staged a performance work, Brother Cane, in protest of the arrest of 12 homosexual men and the publishing of their personal details in mainstream newspapers during anti-gay operations in 1993. During the final minutes of the performance, Ng turned his back to the audience and trimmed his pubic hair, a moment photographed by The New Paper and sensationalised as an obscene act in a newspaper article. Following the public outcry, 5th Passage was charged with breaching the conditions of its Public Entertainment License, blacklisted from funding by Singapore's National Arts Council, and evicted from its Parkway Parade site. Iris Tan, as the gallery manager of the 5th Passage, was prosecuted by the Singapore High Court alongside Ng. Described as one of the "darkest moments of Singapore's contemporary art scene", the incident led to a ten-year no-funding rule for performance art, a ruling lifted only in 2003.

In 1994, 5th Passage received a ten-month offer to curate shows at vacant shop units in the Pacific Plaza shopping centre, which the initiative took up. Here, Victor's practice shifted from the performative body to the performative installation, grieving for the silencing of 5th Passage and all Singapore artists, with the work Expense of Spirit in a Waste of Shame being a kinetic sound installation of light bulbs gently tapping against mirrors positioned in a bed of crushed glass. Around a year after 5th Passage's programmes at Pacific Plaza, the founder-directors of the initiative left for further studies and the group disbanded. Later, Victor performed Still Waters (between estrangement and reconciliation) at the Singapore Art Museum, a rare publicly-staged performance work between 1994 to 2003, described by Victor as a work responding to the de facto performance art ban and the loss of the 5th Passage space.

Institutions, biennales, and international circulation 

By the late 1990s, the landscape for the arts in Singapore had been significantly altered with the establishment of statutory boards and institutions for arts and heritage, as well as the de facto ban on performance art from 1994. In August 1995, at the opening of the Singapore Art '95, an exhibition and sale of artworks by Singapore artists, Tang Da Wu performed a well-known artistic gesture. Tang wore a black jacket emblazoned on the back with "Don't give money to the arts" in yellow and walked up to the then President of Singapore Ong Teng Cheong, a guest at the opening. Tang handed the president a note that read, "I am an artist. I am important." Although Tang was prevented from speaking to the President by an aide-de-camp, he later told the media he wished to tell the President that artists are important and that public money funded the "wrong kind of art", that is, art that was commercial. Such ideas can also be seen directly in relation to the no-funding rule for performance art, a form that Tang was a strong proponent of.

Growing international recognition by curators and art historians in the art of Southeast Asia and Singapore meant that some Singaporean artists could develop their practices overseas in spite of the performance art ban, participating in major international art events like the Artists' Regional Exchange, Documenta, the Asia-Pacific Triennale of Contemporary Art, and the Fukuoka Asian Art Triennale. The National Arts Council set up an International Relations Unit in 1997 to identify and set up artists with international events, and in 2000, the Renaissance City Plan was launched to provide a vision and plan for the promotion of arts and culture, famously seeking to position Singapore as a global city for the arts.

During the late-1990s and early 2000s, artists such as Amanda Heng and Lee Wen exhibited internationally, well-known for their performance artworks. Matthew Ngui was the first Singaporean artist to show at Documenta X in Kassel in 1997, presenting the installation and performance You can order and eat delicious poh-piah', amongst other things (1997), which saw him performing by preparing the Singaporean dish of poh-piah for visitors who had to order food through a complex set-up of plastic pipes. The installation included Walks through a Chair, an anamorphic chair that relies on optical illusion to reconstruct itself from a deconstructed state depending on a viewer's perspective. This was accompanied by a video that shows the artist 'walking through' the chair. Ngui's work highlights the tension between reality and image, playing with notions of unstable, shifting perceptions, as well as the fallibility of a singular point of view.

2000s onwards 

In 2001, Singapore participated in the Venice Biennale with its own national pavilion for the first time, with artists Henri Chen KeZhan, Matthew Ngui, Salleh Japar, and Suzann Victor exhibiting work. Singapore continued its participation in the Venice Biennale with the exception of 2013, when the National Arts Council reassessed its participation in future biennales and resumed in 2015 after signing a 20-year lease on a national pavilion at the Arsenale in Venice. 

Documenta11 in 2002 would see the participation of Charles Lim and Woon Tien Wei as the internet art collective tsunamii.net, presenting the work alpha 3.4 (2002). After several years of hosting large-scale exhibitions such as the Singapore Art Show, the Nokia Singapore Art series, and SENI Singapore in 2004, Singapore launched the inaugural Singapore Biennale in 2006.

In 2003, the "Art in Transit" (AIT) initiative was established by the Land Transport Authority (LTA) in tandem with the completion of the North East Line on the country's Mass Rapid Transit (MRT) system. The initiative gave MRT stations specially commissioned permanent artworks by Singaporean artists in a wide variety of art styles and mediums, including sculptures, murals and mosaics often integrated into the stations' interior architecture. With over 300 art pieces across 80 stations, it is Singapore's largest public art programme.

In 2009, Ming Wong was the first Singaporean to receive an award at the Venice Biennale, receiving the Special Mention (Expanding Worlds) during the Biennale's Opening Ceremony for his work Life of Imitation. The NTU Centre for Contemporary Art Singapore opened in 2013 with Ute Meta Bauer as founding director, and the National Gallery Singapore opened in 2015. Singaporean art continues in its circulation, with artists such as Ho Tzu Nyen and Shubigi Rao making appearances on the on the 2019 edition of the ArtReview Power 100 list, which charts the most influential individuals working in contemporary art.

See also 
Art museums and galleries in Singapore
List of visual artists from Singapore
Singaporean artist groups and collectives
Singaporean art curators
Singaporean art historians
Singaporean art patrons
Gillman Barracks

Further reading

References

External links 
Kwok, Kian Chow (1996). Channels & Confluences: A History of Singapore Art. 
National Heritage Board's portal for national collections and resources, roots.sg
National Library Board's National Online Repository of the Arts (NORA)

Singaporean art
Asian art